Pachypodistes paralysisalis is a species of snout moth in the genus Pachypodistes. It was discovered by Harrison Gray Dyar Jr. in 1914 and is known from Panama.

References

Moths described in 1914
Chrysauginae